Gravelotte may refer to:

 Gravelotte, a village and commune in the Moselle département, in France, and the site of the Battle of Gravelotte on August 18, 1870
 Gravelotte, Limpopo, in South Africa
 Eugène-Henri Gravelotte (1876-1939), a French fencer